Jamie Reidy (born March 31, 1970) is an author, screenwriter and Huffington Post blogger.

After graduating from the University of Notre Dame in 1992, he served with distinction as a U.S. Army officer. He then spent nine years in pharmaceutical sales with Pfizer and Eli Lilly and Company.

His first book Hard Sell: The Evolution of a Viagra Salesman offers a self-deprecating look at the life of a drug rep, climaxing in his selling Viagra. Fox 2000 produced the film Love & Other Drugs based on the book. Reidy’s second book Bachelor 101: Cooking + Cleaning = Closing is a cookbook/lifestyle guide for single guys.

His third book, A Walk's As Good As A Hit was published by HumorOutcasts Press in 2013.

On the Huffington Post, he maintains a blog that contains nothing political.

Reidy has appeared live on CNBC's Power Lunch, Squawk Box and Closing Bell, and on CNN's In The Money.

References

External links 
 University of Notre Dame article on Jamie Reidy '92
 Newsweek article Confessions of a Viagra Salesman
 Fired Lily Rep's Story Hits Big Screen NBC wthr.com
 Jamie Reidy IMDB entry
 Love & Other Drugs official movie site
 Love and Other Drugs movie trailer
 Cooking + Cleaning = Closing book
 Jamie Reidy's blog
 Jamie Reidy talks about wasting his 20s on podcast

HuffPost writers and columnists
University of Notre Dame alumni
Living people
1970 births